Kenneth Arthur Jessell (born July 10, 1955) is an American educator, university administrator, professor and the sixth and current president of Florida International University. He succeeded Mark B. Rosenberg as the interim president in January 2022, following Rosenberg's resignation and allegations of sexual harassment. He agreed to a three-year contract and an annual base salary of $650,000 and a performance-based bonus of $175,000, with his total compensation package coming out to $996,081, and was approved by the FIU Board of Trustees on October 17, 2022, and he was confirmed as president by the Florida Board of Governors on November 9, 2022.

Prior to becoming president Jessel served as the senior vice president for finance and administration and chief financial officer at FIU since 2009. He is also a professor of finance at the Florida International University College of Business.

Jessell received his Bachelor of Arts in political science from Florida State University. He also holds a Master of Business Administration degree and a Doctor of Philosophy degree in finance from FSU.

Jessell is a native South Floridian and he and his wife Lori reside in the Brickell neighborhood of Miami, Florida, and have two adult children, Amanda and John, and a grandson James.

References

Living people
1955 births
Florida State University alumni
Florida International University faculty
Presidents of Florida International University